Our Saviour Lutheran School is a private, Lutheran Church–Missouri Synod, co-educational school in Morris Park, Bronx, New York City, New York, United States. The origins of its younger grades' school began in 1942, and its high school was established in 1955. It is part of the Lutheran Church of Our Saviour.

Its class sizes are small and there is a dress code. It is an accredited member of the Middle States Association of Colleges and Schools.

Athletics 
The school's athletic teams are known as the Falcons. Three sports are offered: basketball, track and field, and volleyball. The basketball program has produced several NCAA Division I college recruits.

Notable alumni 
  Justin Burrell, basketball player
Scott La Rock, musician

Notable alumni 
 Scott Monroe Sterling, aka DJ Scott La Rock,rapper, DJ, music producer< />

Notable alumni 
 Scott Monroe Sterling, aka DJ Scott La Rock, Rapper, DJ, Producer

References

External links 
 

Morris Park, Bronx
Private elementary schools in the Bronx
Private middle schools in the Bronx
Private high schools in the Bronx
Lutheran schools in New York (state)
Schools affiliated with the Lutheran Church–Missouri Synod
Educational institutions established in 1942
1942 establishments in New York City